The quadratrix or trisectrix of Hippias (also quadratrix of Dinostratus) is a curve which is created by a uniform motion. It is one of the oldest examples for a kinematic curve (a curve created through motion). Its discovery is attributed to the Greek sophist Hippias of Elis, who used it around 420 BC in an attempt to solve the angle trisection problem (hence trisectrix). Later around 350 BC Dinostratus used it in an attempt to solve the problem of squaring the circle (hence quadratrix).

Definition 

Then the quadratrix is defined as the locus of the intersection of line segment  with the parallel line to  through .

If one places such a square  with side length  in a (Cartesian) coordinate system with the side  on the -axis and with vertex  at the origin, then the quadratix is described by a planar curve  with

This description can also be used to give an analytical rather than a geometric definition of the quadratrix and to extend it beyond the  interval.

To describe the quadratrix as simple function rather than planar curve, it is advantageous to swap the -axis and the -axis, that is to place the side  on the -axis rather than on the -axis. Then the quadratrix forms the graph of the function

Angle trisection 

The trisection of an arbitrary angle using only ruler and compasses is impossible. However, if the quadratrix is allowed as an additional tool, it is possible to divide an arbitrary angle into  equal segments and hence a trisection becomes possible. In practical terms the quadratrix can be drawn with the help of a template or a quadratrix compass (see drawing).

Since, by the definition of the quadratrix, the traversed angle is proportional to the traversed segment of the associated squares' side dividing that segment on the side into  equal parts yields a partition of the associated angle as well. Dividing the line segment into  equal parts with ruler and compass is possible due to the intercept theorem.

For a given angle  (at most 90°) construct a square  over its leg . Now the segment  corresponds to the angle  and due to the definition of the quadratrix any division of the segment  into  equal segments yields a corresponding division of the angle  into  equal angles. These parallel lines divide the segment  into  equal segments. Connecting their points of intersection to  yields a partition of angle   into  equal angles.

Since not all points of the trisectrix can be constructed with circle and compass alone, it is really required as an additional tool next to compass and circle. However it is possible to construct a dense subset of the trisectrix by circle and compass, so while one cannot assure an exact division of an angle into  parts without a given trisectrix, one can construct an arbitrarily close approximation by circle and compass alone.

Squaring of the circle 

Squaring the circle with ruler and compass alone is impossible. However, if one allows the quadratrix of Hippias as an additional construction tool, the squaring of the circle becomes possible due to Dinostratus' theorem. It lets one turn a quarter circle into square of the same area, hence a square with twice the side length has the same area as the full circle.

For a given quarter circle with radius r one constructs the associated square ABCD with side length r. Then the line through A and K intersects the extension of the side  in L and from the intercept theorem follows . Extending  to the right by a new line segment  yields the rectangle  BLNO with sides  and  the area of which matches the area of the quarter circle. This rectangle can be transformed into a square of the same area with the help of Euclid's geometric mean theorem. The extension of  meets the half circle in R and due to Thales' theorem the line segment  is the altitude of the right-angled triangle QNR. Hence the geometric mean theorem can be applied, which means that  forms the side of a square OUSR with the same area as the rectangle BLNO and hence as the quarter circle.

Note that the point J, where the quadratrix meets the side  of the associated square, is one of the points of the quadratrix that cannot be constructed with ruler and compass alone and not even with the help of the quadratrix compass based on the original geometric definition (see drawing). This is due to the fact that the two uniformly moving lines coincide and hence there exists no unique intersection point. However relying on the generalized definition of the quadratrix as a function or planar curve allows for J being a point on the quadratrix.

Historical sources 
The quadratrix is mentioned in the works of Proclus (412–485), Pappus of Alexandria (3rd and 4th centuries) and Iamblichus (c. 240 – c. 325). Proclus names Hippias as the inventor of a curve called quadratrix and describes somewhere else how Hippias has applied the curve on the trisection problem. Pappus only mentions how a curve named quadratrix was used by Dinostratus, Nicomedes and others to square the circle. He neither mentions Hippias nor attributes the invention of the quadratrix to a particular person. Iamblichus just writes in a single line, that a curve called a quadratrix was used by Nicomedes to square the circle.

Although based on Proclus' name for the curve it is conceivable that Hippias himself used it for squaring the circle or some other curvilinear figure, most historians of mathematics assume that Hippias invented the curve, but used it only for the trisection of angles. Its use for squaring the circle only occurred decades later and was due to mathematicians like Dinostratus and Nicomedes. This interpretation of the historical sources goes back to the German mathematician and historian Moritz Cantor.

See also 
 Greek mathematics

References

Further reading 
Claudi Alsina, Roger B. Nelsen: Charming Proofs: A Journey Into Elegant Mathematics. MAA 2010, pp. 146–147
Felix Klein: Famous Problems of Elementary Geometry. Cosimo 2007 (Nachdruck), pp. 57–58 (complete online copy at archive.org)

External links 

Michael D. Huberty, Ko Hayashi, Chia Vang:  Hippias' Quadratrix

Euclidean plane geometry
Curves
Squaring the circle
Area